

Gmina Sośnicowice is an urban-rural gmina (administrative district) in Gliwice County, Silesian Voivodeship, in southern Poland.

The gmina contains part of the protected area called Rudy Landscape Park.

Villages
Apart from the town of Sośnicowice, Gmina Sośnicowice contains the villages and settlements of Bargłówka, Gajówka, Kozłów, Kuźniczka, Łany Wielkie, Nowa Wieś, Podlesie, Rachowice, Sierakowice, Sierakowiczki, Smolnica, Trachy, Tworóg Mały, Wesoła and Zamoście.

Neighbouring gminas
Gmina Sośnicowice is bordered by the city of Gliwice and by the gminas of Bierawa, Kuźnia Raciborska, Pilchowice and Rudziniec.

Twin towns – sister cities

Gmina Sośnicowice is twinned with:
 Linden, Germany
 Loučná nad Desnou, Czech Republic

References

Sosnicowice
Gliwice County